Studstill is a surname. Notable people with the surname include:

Darren Studstill (born 1970), American football player
Pamela Studstill (born 1954), American quilter
Pat Studstill (1938–2021), American football player